Mirjana Roksandic is a Serbian and Canadian paleoanthropologist. She is a professor at the University of Winnipeg.

Education
She has a Ph.D. from Simon Fraser University.

Publications

 Position of skeletal remains as a key to understanding mortuary behavior
 Greater sciatic notch as a sex indicator in juveniles
The cultural dynamics of shell-matrix sites
Paleoanthropology of the Balkans and Anatolia : Human Evolution and its Context

References

External links 

Canadian anthropologists
Academic staff of University of Winnipeg
Simon Fraser University alumni
Year of birth missing (living people)
Living people